Charles Prosek Williams (October 11, 1947 – January 27, 2015) was a Major League Baseball pitcher. He is best known for being the player the New York Mets traded to the San Francisco Giants for Willie Mays.

New York Mets
Williams was selected by the Mets in the seventh round of the 1968 Major League Baseball Draft after having played college baseball at Parsons College. On April 23, he made his major league debut at Wrigley Field in Chicago, pitching 2.2 innings and giving up four runs (two earned) in the Mets' 7–6 extra innings victory over the Cubs (the winning pitcher of the game was future Hall of Famer Nolan Ryan). For the season, Williams compiled a 5–6 record, making nine starts, with a 4.78 earned run average and 53 strikeouts.

San Francisco Giants
Williams began the  season with the Mets' Triple-A affiliate, the Tidewater Tides, when he was traded to the San Francisco Giants with $50,000 for Willie Mays. Williams appeared in only three games for the Giants that season, spending most of it with their Triple-A affiliate, the Phoenix Giants (10–10, 4.60 ERA).

His final game was on September 11, against the Los Angeles Dodgers at Candlestick Park.

After baseball
Following the conclusion of his baseball career, Williams was briefly a New York City taxi driver. He later settled in Port Orange, Florida and died in Daytona Beach on January 27, 2015, from complications resulting from heart surgery.

References

External links

Major League Baseball pitchers
New York Mets players
San Francisco Giants players
Mankato Mets players
Phoenix Giants players
Visalia Mets players
Tidewater Tides players
Memphis Blues players
Charleston Charlies players
1947 births
2015 deaths
Baseball players from New York (state)
People from Flushing, Queens
Florida Instructional League Mets players